The 2020 Malaysia Masters (officially known as the Perodua Malaysia Masters 2020 for sponsorship reasons) was a badminton tournament that took place at the Axiata Arena in Malaysia from 7 to 12 January 2020 and had a total purse of $400,000.

Tournament
The 2020 Malaysia Masters was the first tournament of the 2020 BWF World Tour and also part of the Malaysia Masters championships, which had been held since 2009. This tournament was organized by the Badminton Association of Malaysia and sanctioned by the BWF.

Venue
This international tournament was held at the Axiata Arena in Kuala Lumpur, Malaysia.

Point distribution
Below is the point distribution for each phase of the tournament based on the BWF points system for the BWF World Tour Super 500 event.

Prize money
The total prize money for this tournament was US$400,000. Distribution of prize money was in accordance with BWF regulations.

Men's singles

Seeds

 Kento Momota (champion)
 Chou Tien-chen (second round)
 Anders Antonsen (first round)
 Chen Long (quarter-finals)
 Viktor Axelsen (final)
 Jonatan Christie (quarter-finals)
 Shi Yuqi (quarter-finals)
 Anthony Sinisuka Ginting (first round)

Finals

Top half

Section 1

Section 2

Bottom half

Section 3

Section 4

Women's singles

Seeds

 Tai Tzu-ying (final)
 Chen Yufei (champion)
 Nozomi Okuhara (quarter-finals)
 Akane Yamaguchi (first round)
 Ratchanok Intanon (second round)
 P. V. Sindhu (quarter-finals)
 He Bingjiao (semi-finals)
 An Se-young (second round)

Finals

Top half

Section 1

Section 2

Bottom half

Section 3

Section 4

Men's doubles

Seeds

 Marcus Fernaldi Gideon / Kevin Sanjaya Sukamuljo (quarter-finals)
 Mohammad Ahsan / Hendra Setiawan (semi-finals)
 Li Junhui / Liu Yuchen (final)
 Takeshi Kamura / Keigo Sonoda (second round)
 Fajar Alfian / Muhammad Rian Ardianto (semi-finals)
 Hiroyuki Endo / Yuta Watanabe (withdrew)
 Lee Yang / Wang Chi-lin (quarter-finals)
 Han Chengkai / Zhou Haodong (second round)

Finals

Top half

Section 1

Section 2

Bottom half

Section 3

Section 4

Women's doubles

Seeds

 Chen Qingchen / Jia Yifan (second round)
 Yuki Fukushima / Sayaka Hirota (second round)
 Mayu Matsumoto / Wakana Nagahara (withdrew)
 Misaki Matsutomo / Ayaka Takahashi (quarter-finals)
 Lee So-hee / Shin Seung-chan (quarter-finals)
 Kim So-yeong / Kong Hee-yong (quarter-finals)
 Du Yue / Li Yinhui (final)
 Greysia Polii / Apriyani Rahayu (semi-finals)

Finals

Top half

Section 1

Section 2

Bottom half

Section 3

Section 4

Mixed doubles

Seeds

 Zheng Siwei / Huang Yaqiong (champions)
 Wang Yilyu / Huang Dongping (final)
 Yuta Watanabe / Arisa Higashino (withdrew)
 Dechapol Puavaranukroh / Sapsiree Taerattanachai (second round)
 Praveen Jordan / Melati Daeva Oktavianti (first round)
 Chan Peng Soon / Goh Liu Ying (semi-finals)
 Seo Seung-jae / Chae Yoo-jung (first round)
 Goh Soon Huat / Shevon Jemie Lai (quarter-finals)

Finals

Top half

Section 1

Section 2

Bottom half

Section 3

Section 4

References

External links
 Tournament Link

Malaysia Masters
Malaysia Masters
Malaysia Masters
Malaysia Masters